Книга Мастеров is a Russian fantasy film produced by the CIS division of the Disney company and directed by Vadim Sokolovsky.  It was released in Russia on October 29, 2009.  The story is based on Russian fairy tales, such as "The Stone Flower" and other stories from The Malachite Casket collection. It is Disney's first film made in Russia, and their only standalone film.

Plot

A beautiful and kind girl, daughter of Baba Yaga, finds a magical stone Alatyr (mythology) while walking in a field. It transforms her heart into a stone and puts her under a strange curse. She is to be the evil Countess of Stones and live in a stone tower. If the greatest gem-cutter in the world brings the stone of Alatyr to life, though, she'll become the ruler of the world.

The Stone Countess, now cruel and selfish, is fascinated with the idea. She starts searching for the best gem-cutters and forces them to work with Alatyr, so the magical stone would become a living thing. Neither of the gem-cutters succeeds, so she kills them. While being imprisoned in her tower, they work on a large book about the secrets of gem-cutting. Each of them edits the book, so it's later named "the Book of Masters".

Meanwhile, the Countess creates a talking magic mirror, whom she treats like a soulless thing. Also, she makes a large army of stone soldiers - the Ardars. She often sends them to terrorize common people and to capture some of them to feed Baba Yaga, who's mostly a cannibal.

The plot develops, picturing a young orphan Ivan, who lives in an ordinary village but dreams of becoming the world's best gem-cutter. His father had actually been kidnapped by the Stone Countess, and Ivan also secretly plans to avenge it.

One day, he makes a sculpture of his landlord's daughter Clava, showing her fatness and ugliness in a grotesque way. The landlord, who adores his daughter, orders to punish Ivan severely. The execution doesn't even start before the village faces another attack of the Ardars, who capture Ivan and Clava and bring them to Baba Yaga.

Baba Yaga goes to feed the Ardars, and Ivan and Clava are unexpectedly freed by a lovely young girl, who calls herself Katia, the Stone Countess's daughter. Clava takes the chance to run away from Baba Yaga's house, but Ivan is caught by Baba Yaga. She attempts to make a soup of him but is distracted again by Iangul, the Ardars' commander, who comes again to see Katia. Baba Yaga disapproves of it, so she goes to send him away.

Katia hides Ivan and, when Iangul leaves and Baba Yaga goes to sleep, shows Ivan a passageway to the stone tower. One can enter it through a well if the Stone Countess allows. Ivan tells Katia of his dream to become a professional gem-cutter and avenge his father's death. So Katia gives him the Book of Masters to study but warns him about her mother's evil power.

Ivan studies the Book for a year. He has fallen for Katia and misses her terribly. But the fat landlady Clava wants to marry him, being sure that he's her rescuer. Moreover, the Stone Countess orders Katia to marry Iangul (who genuinely loves the girl). As for Ivan's ugly fiancee, she also has an admirer - Ivan's friend Cusma, a blacksmith.

Finally, Ivan finishes studying the Book and goes to the stone tower. The Countess promises him Katia's hand in exchange for bringing Alatyr to life. Ivan believes her and soon carves the stone into a perfect shape of a red rose, and it becomes alive.

But the Countess has tricked him. He sees Katia in a dream, and she tells him they'll never be together. Furious, Ivan runs to the forest where Baba Yaga lives to ask her for help. The Ardars are sent to kill him, but Cusma distracts them and they kill him instead.

Searching for Baba Yaga's house, Ivan meets a helpful talking horse, frees a captured mermaid and helps a bored bogatyr. Finally he finds Baba Yaga, who tells him about magical diamonds able to cancel Alatyr's black powers. Also she gives him a bottle with the water of life, and Ivan revives Cusma.

Then Baba Yaga's magic transport him to Koschei the Deathless, who is the owner of the magical diamonds. First Koschei refuses to give them to Ivan, but he is convinced to do this by his fiancee, the mermaid rescued by Ivan. So Ivan takes the diamonds and hurries to the tower, where Katia's soul is being given to Alatyr in order to make the stone fully alive.

Ivan saves Katia and steals Alatyr just in time, and they rush to the passageway to the non-magical world. They are stopped by Iangul, who still hopes that Katia will be his wife. Katia's sure Iangul is going to kill Ivan, so she offers herself in exchange for Ivan's life. Realizing that Katia doesn't love him, Iangul lets both of them run away. The Stone Countess turns him into a stone when she finds out.

But when the Countess catches Ivan and orders him to give her Alatyr back, Ivan is no longer afraid of her. He adorns Alatyr with the magical diamonds, and they break the spell that kept the Countess evil. So she's kind and sweet again and happily allows Katia to marry Ivan. The landlady Clava turns sad, because she wants to marry someone too. Her father says that he'll give her to anyone, and Cusma at last declares his love for Clava.

The two couples are wedded and live happily ever after.

Cast
Mariya Andreyeva as Katya
Maxim Loktionov as Ivan
Irina Apeksimova as the Stone Countess
Arthur Smolyaninov as Iangul
Valentin Gaft as the magic mirror
Leonid Kuravlev as the landlord
Olga Yergina as Clava
Alexander Lenkov as the village's senior gem-cutter
Liya Akhedzhakova as Baba Yaga
Nikolay Yefremov as Cusma
Mikhail Yefremov as the bogatyr
Sergey Garmash as the talking horse
Yekaterina Vilkova as the mermaid
Gosha Kutsenko as Koschei
Olga Aroseva as the story-teller

Criticism

The critics have different opinions of the film. Most judge it for modernizing Russian old folklore, but some episodes of the script are considered well-done. Also the critical reviews praise several actors for their performance. These actors are mostly the ones who played secondary characters - Arthur Smolyaninov as Iangul, Valentin Gaft as the mirror, Sergey Garmash as the talking horse etc.

References

External links
 
 The Book of Masters at Yahoo! Movies
 Home of the Mouse Finds Box Office Success in the Land of the Bear, NY Times article.

2009 films
Russian children's fantasy films
2000s Russian-language films
Films based on Russian folklore
Fantasy crossover films
Walt Disney Pictures films
Films based on fairy tales
2009 directorial debut films